is a complication of songs of characters from Sister Princess, a light novel that was published in Dengeki G's Magazine. This album differs from the game and anime versions as a standalone image album.

Track listing

Notes

External links
  Official website > CD section (from the old ASCII Media Works archive)
  Amazon Japan

2001 albums
Sister Princess